Vennerød is a Norwegian surname. Notable people with the surname include:

Maria Tryti Vennerød (born 1978), Norwegian playwright
Øyvind Vennerød (1919–1991), Norwegian film director
Petter Vennerød (born 1948), Norwegian film director

Norwegian-language surnames